Shark River Hills is an unincorporated community and census-designated place (CDP) within Neptune Township, in Monmouth County, New Jersey, United States. As of the 2010 United States Census, the CDP's population was 3,697.

Geography
According to the United States Census Bureau, the CDP had a total area of 0.981 square miles (2.540 km2), including 0.891 square miles (2.307 km2) of land and 0.090 square miles (0.232 km2) of water (9.15%).

Climate
The climate in this area is characterized by hot, humid summers and generally mild to cool winters.  According to the Köppen Climate Classification system, Shark River Hills has a humid subtropical climate, abbreviated "Cfa" on climate maps.

Demographics

Census 2010

Census 2000
As of the 2000 United States Census there were 3,878 people, 1,509 households, and 1,106 families living in the CDP. The population density was 1,782.5/km2 (4,610.2/mi2). There were 1,558 housing units at an average density of 716.1/km2 (1,852.2/mi2). The racial makeup of the CDP was 97.40% White, 0.57% African American, 0.03% Native American, 0.80% Asian, 0.03% Pacific Islander, 0.28% from other races, and 0.90% from two or more races. Hispanic or Latino of any race were 1.24% of the population.

There were 1,509 households, out of which 30.6% had children under the age of 18 living with them, 62.7% were married couples living together, 8.1% had a female householder with no husband present, and 26.7% were non-families. 21.5% of all households were made up of individuals, and 7.0% had someone living alone who was 65 years of age or older. The average household size was 2.57 and the average family size was 3.03.

In the CDP the population was spread out, with 22.3% under the age of 18, 5.5% from 18 to 24, 30.8% from 25 to 44, 28.4% from 45 to 64, and 13.0% who were 65 years of age or older. The median age was 41 years. For every 100 females, there were 94.5 males. For every 100 females age 18 and over, there were 92.7 males.

The median income for a household in the CDP was $68,508, and the median income for a family was $71,591. Males had a median income of $57,950 versus $35,938 for females. The per capita income for the CDP was $31,196. About 1.4% of families and 1.9% of the population were below the poverty line, including none of those under age 18 and 7.9% of those age 65 or over.

Education
The Neptune Township Schools serve students in pre-kindergarten through twelfth grade from Shark River Hills and the entire township. There is only one school in Shark River Hills. It is Shark River Hills Elementary School, founded in 1956.

See also
Shark River (New Jersey)
Shark River Park

References

External links

 Neptune Township website

Census-designated places in Monmouth County, New Jersey
Neptune Township, New Jersey